Addi Hilo is a reservoir located in the Inderta woreda of the Tigray Region in Ethiopia. The earthen dam that holds the reservoir was built in 1998 by SAERT.

Dam characteristics 
 Dam height: 11.4 metres
 Dam crest length: 171 metres
 Spillway width: 1 metre

Capacity 
 Original capacity: 108 806 m³
 Dead storage: 4328 m³
 Reservoir area: 2.5 ha
In 2002, the life expectancy of the reservoir (the duration before it is filled with sediment) was estimated at 9 years.

Irrigation 
 Designed irrigated area: 9 ha
 Actual irrigated area in 2002: 9 ha

Environment 
The catchment of the reservoir is 0.72 km² large, with a perimeter of 3.34 km and a length of 1210 metres. The reservoir suffers from rapid siltation. The lithology of the catchment is dominantly Agula shale and little Mekelle dolerite. Part of the water that could be used for irrigation is lost through seepage; the positive side-effect is that this contributes to groundwater recharge.

References 

1998 establishments in Ethiopia

Reservoirs in Ethiopia
Tigray Region